Cesar is a civil parish in the municipality of Oliveira de Azeméis, Portugal. The population in 2011 was 3,166, in an area of 5.43 km2. Town status received 1990-07-13.

References

Towns in Portugal
Freguesias of Oliveira de Azeméis